Cody Michael Whitehair (born July 11, 1992) is an American football offensive guard for the Chicago Bears of the National Football League (NFL).  He played college football at Kansas State.

High school career
A native of Abilene, Kansas, Whitehair attended Abilene High School, where he was a two-way lineman for the Cowboys football varsity. In his senior year, he was named to PrepStar magazine’s All-Midlands Region team after being credited with 140 pancake blocks and 81 total tackles (41 solo, 40 assisted) with 15 sacks on the season, as Abilene finished 10–1 after losing to Buhler in the second round of the KSHSAA 4A state playoffs.

College career
After redshirting his first year at Kansas State in 2011, Whitehair became a starter at guard in 2012 and 2013. Prior to his junior year in 2014, he moved to offensive tackle, where he started as a junior and senior.

Professional career

Whitehair was selected in the second round, 56th overall by the Chicago Bears in the 2016 NFL draft. After a season-ending injury to 2015 third round pick Hroniss Grasu in training camp, Whitehair started at left guard during the preseason. Whitehair was then moved to the starting center position after the team signed veteran guard Josh Sitton. He went on to start all 16 games at center and was named to the PFWA All-Rookie Team.

In 2018, Whitehair played every offensive snap and was named to the 2019 Pro Bowl, becoming the first Bears center since Olin Kreutz to play in the all-star game. He was the only Bears player on either side of the ball to participate in every down.

Before the 2019 season, Whitehair moved to left guard, while that position's starter, James Daniels, shifted to center. On September 1, Whitehair signed a five-year contract extension worth $52.5 million with $27.5 million guaranteed. In November, with the offense struggling in the midst of a four-game losing streak, Whitehair returned to center.

Whitehair was placed on the reserve/COVID-19 list by the team on November 6, 2020, and activated on November 16.

In 2022, Whitehair suffered a knee injury in Week 4 and was placed on injured reserve on October 5, 2022. He was activated on November 4.

References

External links
Chicago Bears bio
Kansas State Wildcats bio

1992 births
Living people
American football centers
American football offensive guards
American football offensive tackles
Chicago Bears players
Kansas State Wildcats football players
National Conference Pro Bowl players
People from Abilene, Kansas
People from Kearney, Nebraska
Players of American football from Kansas
Players of American football from Nebraska